Gulab Yadav is an Indian politician. He was elected to the Bihar Legislative Assembly from Jhanjharpur in the 2015 Member of Bihar Legislative Assembly as a member of the Rashtriya Janata Dal. He also contested the 2019 Lok Sabha election from Jhanjharpur (Lok Sabha constituency) as a member of Rashtriya Janata Dal but lost.

References

People from Madhubani, India
Bihar MLAs 2015–2020
1968 births
Living people
Rashtriya Janata Dal politicians
Candidates in the 2019 Indian general election